Aequorea macrodactyla is a species of hydrozoan in the family Aequoreidae. It was first described by Johann Friedrich von Brandt in 1835.

Description
It can have up to 150 tentacles and grow up to 25 cm.

References

Aequoreidae
Animals described in 1835